Tres Agaves is a brand of organic 100% de Agave Tequila and Margarita mixes. The Tequila is produced at Tres Agaves' distillery in the town of Amatitán located in Jalisco, Mexico.

Tres Agaves Tequilas are made from 100% Blue Agave by a family-owned distillery. Tres Agaves Products Inc. produces three varieties of Tequila: Blanco, Reposado and Añejo. Additionally, the company offers four alcohol-free mixer products: Tres Agaves Organic Margarita Mix, Tres Agaves Organic Strawberry Margarita Mix, Tres Agaves Cocktail-Ready Agave Nectar, and Tres Agaves Organic Bloody Mary Mix.

History

The Early Days 
Tres Agaves Products LLC. was founded in 2008, at CEO and Founder Barry Augus' dining room table.  Along with a small team, Barry wrote the first business plan and the original bottle design.  The operation was initially funded by Barry's family inheritance, allowing him and his team to purchase their first Tequila bottle mold.  The company started by selling cocktail-ready agave nectar out of Barry's minivan, hand delivering every order.  In 2010, the company's first case of Tequila shipped to the US from Mexico and sold just a week later. Their three Tequila varieties were originally crafted at the El Llano distillery ( NOM: 1109) in Jalisco, which began production in 1900.

2012 to 2016: Partnership with Trinchero Family Estates 
In late 2012, Tres Agaves entered into a sales and marketing partnership with Trinchero Family Estates. The venture made sense both in a business and a cultural sense. The joint venture allowed Trinchero to enter into the spirits business and gave Tres Agaves the ability to focus on product development while Trinchero brought Tres Agaves into more markets through its robust sales and distribution network.  Of great importance was the cultural importance of family in both organizations, with Trinchero being the second largest family owned winery in the world, and family and friends having enabled Barry to start and grow his business.

2016 to Today: The Tres Agaves Distillery 
In 2016, Tres Agaves purchased land from the Partida family, Barry having known and worked with David Partida for the last 20 years. The purchase allowed Tres Agaves to control its own destiny, by building a home to bring in complete control of its Tequila production operations and become a cultural site for the company and industry. Located on a plot of land in Amatitán, a town minutes outside of the town of Tequila, the Tres Agaves distillery has state-of-the-art production facilities, including a 22-ton autoclave, a four-stage roller mill and stainless steel fermentation tanks.  In addition to these, the distillery has traditional production methods on site, including a tahona wheel and a stone horno.

Iliana Partida - Maestra Tequilera 
In 2018, Tres Agaves appointed Iliana Partida as master distiller - or Maestra Tequilera - of its new distillery.  A member of the Partida family, Iliana was taught by her father to produce Tequila, a tradition of the Partida's spanning four generations.  In taking this role, Iliana becomes one of the very few women to be a master distillery in the Tequila industry.  In fact, according to the New York Times, there are only 12 other Maestra Tequileras in Mexico at this time.

Going Organic 
Tres Agaves has maintained a strong commitment to making the freshest, best tasting Tequila and margaritas.  This commitment began with the first bottle of agave syrup, choosing to make it organic, and continued through the entire line of organic cocktail mixers.  With the construction of the new distillery, Tres Agaves is able to honor its commitment to organic products and has fully transitioned to producing organic Tequila.  This move enhances the flavor by enriching the terroir of Tres Agaves Tequila and matches the growth of consumer preference for organic products in the US.  Tres Agaves commits to sustainable growing practices in the Tequila Valley in addition to local and community development and employment.

Product details

Tequila flavor and aging 
Tres Agaves is characterized by a smooth finish, with no harsh "burn".  Unlike more mass-produced Tequilas, however, Tres Agaves actively strives to bring out the strong agave flavors in its products, enabling the true essence of the spirit to shine through - both in its Tequila and its cocktail mixers. By only selecting agaves grown in the Tequila Valley, Tres Agaves Tequila highlights the terroir of its plants: herb and citrus notes.  The Blanco is unaged so that the spirit is agave-forward and reflecting the strong terroir of the Tequilla Valley agaves.  The Reposado is aged for a minimum of 8 months, producing a delicate balance between the herbaceous and citrus notes of the agaves and the spice and smoother palette stemming from the barrels.  The Añejo has hints of fruit and herbs like rosemary, but most strongly reflects the smoky sweetness of caramel and butterscotch flavors imparted by the varietal's 18 months in barrel.  All Tres Agaves Tequila is distilled only twice to not lose the natural agave flavor, an effect of numerous distillations.

Cocktail Mixes 
Beginning with the first organic margarita mix on the market, Tres Agaves has strived to create natural, organic cocktail mixes, giving home cocktail enthusiasts the right tools to make bar-quality drinks at home.  Tres Agaves Margarita Mix is made with four simple ingredients, lime juice, agave nectar, water, and vitamin C, and balances the fresh, tart lime flavor with the sweetness of the agave nectar.  The Agave Nectar is made with just agave syrup and water, can be substituted wherever a sweetener may be used, and is made to fully dissolve into cold beverages.  The Strawberry Margarita Mix can be used with Tequila for margaritas or with vodka to make a delicious strawberry daiquiri.  Tres Agaves Bloody Mary Mix is made with a proprietary spice blend and can be used to make a Bloody Mary or a Bloody Maria.

Critical reviews
Tres Agaves' Tequilas have been evaluated by numerous spirits ratings competitions including the Ultimate Spirits Challenge, the Beverage Testing Institute, TheFiftyBest.com, the International Spirits Challenge and others. Their Añejo variety was awarded the Chairman's Trophy at the 2010 Ultimate Spirits Challenge with a score of 97/100.

References

External links
Tres Agaves Products Inc. Official Website
Tequila.net
SF Gate Mentions Tres Agaves

Mexican brands
Tequila